The Asian Australian Football Championships, also known as the AFL Asian Championships or Asian Champs is an annual tournament of Australian rules football between AFL Asia member clubs. 

The tournament is considered the pinnacle of Asian Australian football calendar and is challenged by a growing number of teams from over a dozen Asian countries. 21 teams from 13 countries competed in 2018.

Format
The tournament is played over one day with all teams playing shortened games between 20 and 24 minutes duration, with reduced numbers and smaller field sizes. In each division, each team plays each other once then there is a knock-out finals series including Semi-Finals, Preliminary Final and Grand Final.

First division is played as a 16-a-side format.
Second division is played in a 12-a-side format.

There are 3 Men's Divisions, Women's Division and an All-Asia Cup (only local players allowed).

Teams
Teams that have competed include the Hong Kong Dragons, Singapore Wombats, Bali Geckos, Brunei Sharks, China Blues, China Reds, Japan Goannas, Philippine Eagles, Indonesian Bintangs/Volcanoes (as a combined Jakarta and Bali side), Jakarta Bintangs, Thailand Tigers, Vietnam Swans, Malaysian Warriors, Dubai Heat, Cambodian Eagles, Lao Elephants, Myanmar Fighting Cocks, PNG Muruks and Macau Lightning.

History

The Asian Australian Football Championships were first held in 2000, although a precursor tournament named the Four Nations Cup was held in Bangkok, Thailand in 1999. 

There was an offer in 2005 to make the championships part of the Arafura Games, in Darwin, Australia, but this was turned down by Asian clubs.

In 2008 a junior division was introduced, however this was short-lived.

While traditionally the tournament has been dominated by expat-Australian players, local players are becoming more prominent with 40 local players from China, Cambodia, Laos, Thailand, Indonesia, Philippines and Vietnam competing in an East Asia vs South East Asia local player exhibition game in 2015. In 2016 an All-Asian Cup was held the day before the Asian Championships with three all-local player teams. In 2017 a local player quota of 2-players per team was introduced. In 2015 the tournament was expanded to two divisions, with a 16-a-side first division and a 12-a-side second division. 

In 2018 the tournament also included a women's division, with a record 21 teams from 13 countries competing.

Tournament statistics

All-Asia Cup - 2016: All-local player tournament played between Indonesia, China and Indo-China, 2017 and 2018: China vs AFL Asia Lions all-local player match played at the Shanghai AFL game.

See also

 Australian rules football in Asia
 AFL Asia

References

Australian rules football competitions
Australian rules football in Asia